Greta Valley is a town in North Canterbury, 83 km north of Christchurch, New Zealand. It was named after the River Greta in Yorkshire by local runholders Sir Charles Clifford and Sir Frederick Weld in the 1850s, but it is to the east of the Greta River and on the south bank of the Waikari River.

It is situated approximately halfway between Christchurch and Cheviot just off State Highway 1.

2016 earthquake

On 22 November 2016 at 1813 hours an earthquake of 5.7 magnitude struck the town of Scargill, 2 kilometres north-west of Greta Valley. The earthquake was described by locals as severe due to its shallow depth of 7 kilometres. As a result, there was significant damage to the local community hall, houses, and water tanks. The earthquake was considered an aftershock of the 2016 Kaikōura earthquake.

Demographics
Greta Valley is part of the wider Omihi statistical area.

Education

Facilities include a swimming pool, two playing fields, a tennis court and a library.

References

Populated places in Canterbury, New Zealand
Hurunui District